Palta Urqu (Quechua palta avocado, urqu mountain, "avocado mountain", also spelled Palta Orkho) is a mountain in the Andes of Bolivia which reaches a height of approximately . It is located in the Potosí Department, Nor Chichas Province, Cotagaita Municipality. Palta Urqu lies at the Atocha River, southwest of the village of Quechisla.

References 

Mountains of Potosí Department